St. Lawrence High School is a High School in Aurangabad, Maharashtra, India.

References

High schools and secondary schools in Maharashtra
Education in Aurangabad, Maharashtra